Arthur Baker was the creator of a distinctive and dramatic style of brush and pen calligraphy.

Baker was born on the West Coast of the United States.

He studied letter forms and historical calligraphic styles, about which he wrote many books. Baker designed his own pens and brushes.

Baker lives in Andover, Massachusetts. His hobbies include designing, making and flying paper airplanes.

Typefaces
Amigo
Baker Sans—Eddie Bauer catalog logo and text.
Baker Signet—designed in 1965.
Calligraphica
Cold Mountain
Collier Script
Daybreak
Duckweed
Fish Face
Hiroshige
Kigali
Kigali Block
Kigali Decorative
Kigali ZigZag
Marigold
Mercator
Oak Graphic
Oxford
Pelican
Sassafras
Signet—Coca-Cola used Signet Bold for the word 'Coke' and Fleet Bank uses it for its logo.
Tiepolo—Lipton foods.
Visigoth

Bibliography
“Arthur Baker”, in David Consuegra, American Type Design and Designers (New York: Allworth Press, 2004), page 49-53

Books by Arthur Baker
Arthur Baker, Calligraphic Alphabets, (Dover, 1974)
Arthur Baker, The Roman Alphabet, (Art Direction Book Co., 1976) 
Arthur Baker, Dance of the pen, (Art Direction Book Co., 1978) 
Arthur Baker, New Calligraphic Ornaments and Flourishes, (Mineola: Dover, 1981)
Arthur Baker, Chancery Cursive: Stroke by Stroke, (Dover, 1982)
Arthur Baker, Cut and Assemble Paper Airplanes That Fly, (Dover, 1982)
Arthur Baker, Celtic Hand Stroke by Stroke (Irish Half-Uncial from "The Book of Kells"), (Dover, 1983)
Arthur Baker, Calligraphic cut paper designs for artists and craftsmen, (Mineola: Dover, 1983)
Arthur Baker, Calligraphic Swash Initials, (Dover, 1984)
Arthur Baker, Arthur Baker's Historic Calligraphic Alphabets, (Dover)
Arthur Baker, Encyclopedia of Calligraphy Styles

External links 
Biographical sketch and designer page on MyFonts.com

American calligraphers
American non-fiction writers
Year of birth missing (living people)
Living people